Dummett is a surname. Notable people with the surname include:

Douglas Dummett (1806–1873), American politician and farmer
Hugo Dummett (1940–2002), South African geologist
Michael Dummett (1925–2011), British philosopher
Paul Dummett (born 1991), Welsh footballer